Barbara Maria Zakrzewska-Nikiporczyk (born 1 January 1946) is a composer and musicologist who was born in Poznań, Poland. She studied composition with Florian Dąbrowski at the Poznań Academy of Music, graduating in 1969. She finished her postgraduate studies in library and information science in 1974; two years later she received a doctorate at the Institute of History, Adam Mickiewicz University in Poznań. She studied electronic music for three months in Utrecht, Netherlands, in 1981, and in Oxford, England.

Life and career
Zakrzewska-Nikiporczyk began working in the music collection of the Poznań University Library in 1972. Since 1982, she has been the main music bibliographer for Poland, preparing abstracts of Polish music books and articles for the International Bibliography of Musical Literature (Répertoire International de Littérature Musicale; RILM) in New York. In 1996 she began working as a bibliographer for another database project, the Retrospective Index to Music Periodicals (Répertoire International de la Presse Musicale; RIPM). Zakrzewska-Nikiporczyk became the librarian at the University of Southern California's Polish Music Center in 1998, where she catalogued the collections as a Kościuszko Foundation Fellow.

As a musicologist and librarian, Zakrzewska-Nikiporczyk has published 5 books and 68 articles, including her doctoral dissertation about music in Poland from 1870 to 1918. She has lectured in Poland, Germany, Italy and Sweden. Zakrzewska-Nikiporczyk received an award at the Young Polish Composers Competition in 1970 for her vocal work A Ave.

Works
Her other compositions include:

Chamber music 
Cosmic Walks (for school band; 1983) 
Dream (string quartet; 1979)
Enigma (flute, oboe, clarinet, bassoon, alto saxophone, violin, cello; 1979)
Erotic (three flutes, vibraphone, celesta and harp; 1982)
Flies (five double-basses; 1977) 
Folk Fantasy (flute and string quartet; 1979)
Folk Mosaic: 1. Africa. 2. China. 3. Yugoslavia. 4. India. 5. Hungary. 6. Turkey. 7. Africa (for school band; 1978)
Locomotive (percussion ensemble; 1976)
Medium (saxophone, piano, vibraphone, cymbals and double-bass; 1974)
On the Milky Way (string quartet; 1980)
Percussion Triptych (five percussionists; 1975)
Plato’s Music I (violin, piano, organ, harp, celesta and bells; 1974)
Plato's Music II (string orchestra and percussion; 1974)
Reflect (flute; 1968)
Reminiscences (unspecified chamber ensemble; 1985)
Rhythm of Lights and Shadows (organ and tympani; 1967)
Silence and Darkness (string quartet; 1984)
Solitude (double-bass, flute and percussion; 1980)
S.O.S. (flute, saxophone, four temple blocks and violin; 1978)
Space Walks (unspecified instrumental ensemble; 1983)
Time (flute, 2 trumpets, 2 trombones, harp and tympani; 1976)
To the Light (horn, violin and harp; 1975)
Up and down (saxophone; 1993)

Electronic music 
Arteries (synthesizer music on tape; 1991)
Manhattan (synthesizer, computer, tape, saxophone and percussion; 1990)
Spectrum (computer; 1986)
Waving (computer music on tape; 1996)

Keyboard 
Children’s World (piano; 1980)
Deus Meus (organ; 1980)
Magnificat (organ; 1989)
Prelude (organ; 1987)
Repetition (harpsichord; 1979)
Sonatina (piano; 1965)
Three Piano Pieces - 1983
Variations (piano; 1964)

Orchestra 
Arrampicata – 1977
Les Carillons (piano and orchestra; 1980)
Miazga - 1983
Orazione – 1981
Pulp - 1983
Star Dust (violin concerto; 1978)
Tetragonos tri fatos - 1968/1969

Theatre 
Joan and Dragon Thomas (cartoons; 1978)
Object’s Animation (cello; 1985)
Snow White (ballet; women's choir and orchestra; 1976)

Voice 
A ave (narrator, soprano, men's choir and chamber ensemble; 1970)
Buffo (text by Wisława Szymborska; voice and piano; 1985)
Christmas Tree in the Forest (text by Ewa Szelburg; 1978)
Clown (voice and piano; 1985)
Contrary Music (men’s choir and orchestra; 1978)
Eternity (soprano and percussion; 1966)
Fortepian (soprano, marimba and bells; 1968)
Four Songs for Children (text by Józef Ratajczak; 1980)
Generation (soprano, trumpet, double-bass and cymbals; 1969)
Give Us Peace, Lord (voice and piano;1983)
Hail to the Light (a cappella men's choir; 1978)
Hallucinations (soprano, mixed choir and chamber ensemble; 1967)
High Trees (mixed choir; 1975)
Hymn (text by Ryszard Danecki; mixed choir; 1978)
Magnificat (mixed choir; 1985)
Mother (soprano and string orchestra; 1974)
Silence and Darkness (text by Wanda Bacewicz; mixed choir; 1984)
Skrzypce (soprano, harpsichord and tamburino; 1968)
The Saw Has Danced with the Axe (text by Stanisław Karaszewski; voice and piano; 1985)
Two Religious Songs (text by Antoni Kucharczyk and Maria Bartusówna; 1981)
Warmio moja (cantata for soprano, mixed choir, flute and string orchestra; 1985)
Welcome Brilliance (text by Ryszard Danecki; men's choir; 1978)

Sources 

1946 births
Polish classical composers
Living people
Women classical composers
Polish musicologists
Women musicologists
20th-century Polish musicians
20th-century classical composers
20th-century women composers
20th-century musicologists
20th-century Polish women writers
20th-century Polish non-fiction writers
21st-century Polish musicians
21st-century classical composers
21st-century women composers
21st-century musicologists
Adam Mickiewicz University in Poznań alumni
Polish bibliographers
Women bibliographers
University of Southern California people
People from Poznań
Polish women composers